The number of elections in Hamburg varies. Hamburg has a state election every five years, the elections for the state parliament. There are also elections to the federal diet (the lower house of the federal parliament) of Germany, the local elections of the diet of the boroughs (Bezirksversammlungen) and every five years to the European Parliament. All elections take place by universal adult suffrage and are regulated by law.

Voting system 
The voting system for the state and local elections is a mixed member proportional representation. In 2007 the constitutional court of Hamburg declared a new form of election threshold for the state parliament elections unconstitutional.

Referendum and citizen's initiative 
Since 1996 citizen's initiatives or a referendums (Volksbegehren or Volksentscheid) are possible in Hamburg.

History 

Through political reforms in the 1850s the Hamburg parliament turned from an assembly of delegates into an elected legislative. Franchise and terms were changed several times. Until 1901 elections - each time of one fraction of the seats - were held at three consecutive days, till 1913 at possibly up to four days along the categories of enfranchised male state citizens (with citizenship not by birth, but facultative from a certain minimum of annually accrued taxes on, and obligatory from a certain higher level on) of (1) voters enfranchised due to a certain minimum of accrued taxes (voting since 1904 in a two-round system), (2) enfranchised due to owning land within the state boundary and (3) due to counting to the burgher notables (Notabeln) consisting of former and current incumbents of state and related offices. Being included in all three groups allowed a voter to participate thrice in each election. In 1918 franchise became equal and general including woman, elections were from then on held on one day only. State elections have been held on the following dates:

Results 
For the election of 2009 (2004) to the European Union there were 1,256,701 (2004: 1.227.905) voters, a turnout of 34.7% (34.9), gave 432,633 (421,029) valid and 3,633 (7,834) invalid votes. For the state election 2008 there were 1,236,671 voters, with a turnout of 63.4% for the first vote (63.5% 2nd vote/party vote) gave 3,723,546 votes for the first vote (direct candidate vote) and 777,531 for the 2nd vote (party vote).

References

External links 
 Gesetz über die Wahl zur hamburgischen Bürgerschaft (BüWG) in der Fassung vom 22. Juli 1986